Yamanlar is a village in Karşıyaka district of İzmir Province, Turkey. (Karşıyaka is an intracity district of İzmir.) The population of the village is 135 as of 2011.

See also
Yamanlar, the mountain

References

Villages in İzmir Province
Karşıyaka District